This is a list of the National Register of Historic Places listings in Harrison County, West Virginia.

This is intended to be a complete list of the properties and districts on the National Register of Historic Places in Harrison County, West Virginia, United States.  The locations of National Register properties and districts for which the latitude and longitude coordinates are included below, may be seen in a Google map.

There are 21 properties and districts listed on the National Register in the county.  Another property was once listed but has been removed.

Current listings

|}

Former listing

|}

See also 

 List of National Historic Landmarks in West Virginia
 National Register of Historic Places listings in West Virginia

References 

Harrison County